Milford Wesley Brown, Jr. (born August 15, 1980 in Montgomery, Alabama) is a former American football guard who previously played in the National Football League (NFL). He was drafted by the Houston Texans in the sixth round of the 2002 Supplemental Draft. He played college football at East Mississippi Community College 1998-1999, and Florida State 2000-2002.

Brown has also been a member of the Arizona Cardinals, St. Louis Rams, Carolina Panthers, Jacksonville Jaguars and Detroit Lions.

Early years
Brown attended George Washington Carver Senior High School (Montgomery, Alabama) and was a letterman in football. In football, he was a second-team All-State selection.

References

External links
Arizona Cardinals bio
Jacksonville Jaguars bio

1980 births
Living people
Players of American football from Montgomery, Alabama
American football offensive guards
East Mississippi Lions football players
Florida State Seminoles football players
Houston Texans players
Arizona Cardinals players
St. Louis Rams players
Carolina Panthers players
Jacksonville Jaguars players
Detroit Lions players